The RSX 'Reality Synthesizer' is a proprietary graphics processing unit (GPU) codeveloped by Nvidia and Sony for the PlayStation 3 game console. It is a GPU based on the Nvidia 7800GTX graphics processor and, according to Nvidia, is a G70/G71 (previously known as NV47) hybrid architecture with some modifications. The RSX has separate vertex and pixel shader pipelines. The GPU makes use of 256 MB GDDR3 RAM clocked at 650 MHz with an effective transmission rate of 1.3 GHz and up to 224 MB of the 3.2 GHz XDR main memory via the CPU (480 MB max).
Although it carries the majority of the graphics processing, the Cell Broadband Engine, the console's CPU, is also used complementarily for some graphics-related computational loads of the console.

Specifications

Unless otherwise noted, the following specifications are based on a press release by Sony at the E3 2005 conference, slides from the same conference, and slides from a Sony presentation at the 2006 Game Developer's Conference.

 550 MHz Pixel shader clock / 500 MHz Vertex shader clock  on 90 nm process (shrunk to 65 nm in 2008 and to 40 nm in 2010), 300+ million transistors
 Based on NV47 (Nvidia GeForce 7800 architecture)
 Little Endian
 24 texture filtering units (TF) and 8 vertex texture addressing units (TA)
 24 filtered samples per clock
 Maximum Texel fillrate: 13.2 Gigatexels per second (24 textures * 550 MHz)
 32 unfiltered texture samples per clock (8 TA * 4 texture samples)
 8 render output units (ROPs) / pixel rendering pipelines
 Peak pixel fillrate (theoretical): 4.4 Gigapixel per second
 Maximum Z-buffering sample rate: 8.8 Gigasamples per second (2 Z-samples * 8 ROPs * 550 MHz)
 Maximum dot product operations: 51 billion per second (combined with Cell CPU)
 128-bit pixel precision offers High Dynamic Range rendering
 256 MB GDDR3 RAM at 650 MHz
 128-bit memory bus width
 20.8 GB/s read and write bandwidth
 Cell FlexIO bus interface
 Rambus XDR Memory interface bus width: 56bit out of 64bit (serial)
 20 GB/s read to the Cell and XDR memory
 15 GB/s write to the Cell and XDR memory
 576 KB texture cache (96 KB per quad of pixel pipelines)
 Support for PSGL (OpenGL ES 1.1 + Nvidia Cg)
 Support for S3 Texture Compression

Other features: Support for Bilinear, trilinear, anisotropic, quincunx texture filtering,  quincunx antialiasing, up to 4xMSAA, SSAA, Alpha to Coverage and Alphakill.

Model numbers 

90nm: 
 CXD2971AGB
 CXD2971DGB
 CXD2971GB
 CXD2971-1GB
 CXD297BGB

65nm: 
 CXD2982
 CXD2982GB
 CXD2991GB
 CXD2991BGB
 CXD2991GGB
 CXD2991CGB
 CXD2991EGB
 
40nm: 
 CXD5300AGB
 CXD5300A1GB
 CXD5301DGB
 CXD5302DGB
 CXD5302A1GB

Local GDDR3 physical memory structure
 Total Memory 256MB
 2 Partitions (128MB)
 64bit bus per partition
 8 Banks per partition (16MB)
 4096 Pages per bank (4KB) -> 12bit Row Address
 Memory block in a page -> 9bit Column Address
 Minimum access granularity = 8 bytes -> same as buswidth between RSX <> GDDR

RSX memory map 

Although the RSX has 256MB of GDDR3 RAM, not all of it is usable. The last 4MB is reserved for keeping track of the RSX internal state and issued commands. The 4MB of GPU Data contains RAMIN, RAMHT, RAMFC, DMA Objects, Graphic Objects, and the Graphic Context. The following is a breakdown of the address within 256MB of the RSX.

Besides local GDDR3 memory, main XDR memory can be accessed by RSX too, which is limited to either:
 0MB - 256MB (0x00000000 - 0x0FFFFFFF)
-or-
 0MB - 512MB (0x00000000 - 0x1FFFFFFF)

Speed, bandwidth and latency

System bandwidth (theoretical maximum):
Cell to/from 256MB XDR : 25.6 GB/s
Cell to RSX (IOIFO): 20GB/s (practical : 15.8GB/s @ packetsize 128B)
Cell from RSX (IOIFI) : 15GB/s (practical : 11.9GB/s @ packetsize 128B)
RSX to/from 256MB GDDR3 : 20.8GB/s (@ 650 MHz)

Because of the aforementioned layout of the communication path between the different chips, and the latency and bandwidth differences between the various components, there are different access speeds depending on the direction of the access in relation to the source and destination. The following is a chart showing the speed of reads and writes to the GDDR3 and XDR memory from the viewpoint of the Cell and RSX. Note that these are measured speeds (rather than calculated speeds) and they should be worse if RSX and GDDR3 access are involved because these figures were measured when the RSX was clocked at 550Mhz and the GDDR3 memory was clocked at 700Mhz. The shipped PS3 has the RSX clocked in at 500Mhz (front and back end, although the pixel shaders run separately inside at 550Mhz). In addition, the GDDR3 memory was also clocked lower at 650Mhz.

Speed table 

Because of the very slow Cell Read speed from the 256MB GDDR3 memory, it is more efficient for the Cell to work in XDR and then have the RSX pull data from XDR and write to GDDR3 for output to the HDMI display. This is why extra texture lookup instructions were included in the RSX to allow loading data from XDR memory (as opposed to the local GDDR3 memory).

RSX libraries 
The RSX is dedicated to 3D graphics, and developers are able to use different API libraries to access its features. The easiest way is to use high level PSGL, which is basically OpenGL|ES with programmable pipeline added in, however this is unpopular due to the performance overhead on a relatively weak console CPU.

At a lower level developers can use LibGCM, which is an API that builds RSX command buffers at a lower level. (PSGL is actually implemented on top of LibGCM). This is done by setting up commands (via FIFO Context) and DMA Objects and issuing them to the RSX via DMA calls.

Differences with the G70 architecture
The RSX 'Reality Synthesizer' is based on the G70 architecture, but features a few changes to the core. The biggest difference between the two chips is the way the memory bandwidth works. The G70 only supports rendering to local memory, while the RSX is able to render to both system and local memory. Since rendering from system memory has a much higher latency compared to rendering from local memory, the chip's architecture had to be modified to avoid a performance penalty. This was achieved by enlarging the chip size to accommodate larger buffers and caches in order to keep the graphics pipeline full. The result was that the RSX only has 60% of the local memory bandwidth of the G70, making it necessary for developers to use the system memory in order to achieve performance targets.

Other RSX features/differences include:

 More shader instructions
 Extra texture lookup logic (helps RSX transport data from XDR)
 Fast vector normalize

Press releases
Sony staff were quoted in PlayStation Magazine saying that the "RSX shares a lot of inner workings with NVIDIA 7800 which is based on G70 architecture." Since the G70 is capable of carrying out 136 shader operations per clock cycle, the RSX was expected to feature the same number of parallel pixel and vertex shader pipelines as the G70, which contains 24 pixel and 8 vertex pipelines.
 
Nvidia CEO Jen-Hsun Huang stated during Sony's pre-show press conference at E3 2005 that the RSX is twice as powerful as the GeForce 6800 Ultra.

See also 
 Xenos - GPU used in the Xbox 360
 Cell Broadband Engine - CPU used in the PlayStation 3

References 

Nvidia graphics processors
PlayStation 3
Sony semiconductors